MUON is a post-rock and electronica band from Singapore that originally began in 1999 as a solo project by founding member, Nick Chan. The band is influenced by genres such as IDM, ambient, trip hop and drum and bass, and artists such as DJ Shadow, Aphex Twin and The Cinematic Orchestra.

Nick released two albums on his own, 'The Death of Cinema' (2003) and 'In Flught' (2004) before recruiting drummer Edwin Leong in 2005. MUON's latest formation now comprises Nick together with Jordan Chia, Adam Shah and Ren Wong.

The band has performed extensively at gigs and festivals including venues Zouk and 3some in Bangkok, Baybeats Festival at The Esplanade, Enroute Festival, Dual City Sessions, PlusMinusTen, Syndicate Subsessions, Musicity Singapore and Fred Perry 60th Anniversary.

MUON recently released its critically acclaimed fourth studio album, 'The Shape of Shapes to Come' (2012) on its bandcamp.

Current members 
 Nick Chan (Guitar, Production, Programming)
Former member of bands Astreal and I Am David Sparkle

 Jordan Chia (Keyboards, Production, Programming)
 Adam Shah (Percussion)
Former member of band The Observatory

 Ren Wong(Bass)

Discography 
 2012 The Shape of Shapes to Come
 2011 Live at Mosaic Festival
 2008 The New Mutants
 2004 In Flught
 2003 The Death of Cinema
 2002 Bangkok Live

Awards and Accolades 
 2011 'Best Laptop Act' by JUICE Magazine
 2007 Motorola Style Creators Directory
 2006 Winner, Resfest Singapore Nokia Handheld Cinema with SILNT
 2003 Nominated, 'Best Local Dance Act’ at Mediacorp's Lush 99.5FM Singapore Jam Annual Awards
 2003 Charted #1 on Mediacorp's 987FM Earwax:Hip Parade show

References

External links
Official MUON Website
Facebook Page
Vimeo

Singaporean musicians
Singaporean rock music groups
Singaporean indie rock groups